John Alexander Fraser (18 March 1931 – 6 November 2020) was a Scottish actor and author. He is best known for his performances in the films The Dam Busters (1955), 
The Good Companions (1957), The Trials of Oscar Wilde (1960), El Cid (1961), Repulsion (1965) and Isadora (1968).

Career
One of his earliest roles was as Inigo Jollifant in the second film version of J.B. Priestley's The Good Companions (1957). Later, Fraser had leading roles in films such as El Cid, Tunes of Glory, The Trials of Oscar Wilde (playing Lord Alfred Douglas), Roman Polanski's Repulsion, Isadora and Schizo. He made appearances on television series including Danger Man (1964), Casting the Runes (1968), Randall and Hopkirk (1969), Columbo (1972), Doctor Who (1981) and The Bill (1995).

He released several singles in the late 1950s.

In 2004, he published his autobiography, Close Up, in which he wrote frankly about his gay life and friendships. In the book, Fraser wrote that actor Laurence Harvey was gay and that his long-term lover was his manager James Woolf. Of Dirk Bogarde, Fraser wrote, "Dirk's life with [Anthony] Forwood had been so respectable, their love for each other so profound and so enduring, it would have been a glorious day for the pursuit of understanding and the promotion of tolerance if he had screwed up the courage ... to make one dignified allusion to his true nature. Self-love is no substitute for self-respect."

Personal life and death
Fraser died from oesophageal cancer on 6 November 2020 at the age of 89.

Selected filmography

Selected recordings
 1957 - Bye Bye Love / Why Don't They Understand 
 1958 - Presenting John Fraser (EP) with Tony Osborne, the Beryl Stott Group, the Kim Drake Orchestra 
 1958 - Trolley Stop / Bye Bye Love with the Beryl Stott Group 
 1959 - Bye Bye Baby Goodbye 
 1960 - Jaula Dorada / Adios Adios Muchacha / Adios Amor / Por Que No Comprenden

Footnotes

Bibliography of works

External links
 
 
 The Guardian obituary

1931 births
2020 deaths
20th-century Scottish male actors
21st-century Scottish male actors
Deaths from cancer in the United Kingdom
Deaths from esophageal cancer
Scottish gay actors
Scottish gay writers
Male actors from Glasgow
Scottish expatriates in Italy
20th-century Scottish male writers
21st-century Scottish male writers
Scottish male film actors
Scottish male stage actors
Scottish male television actors
20th-century Scottish LGBT people
21st-century Scottish LGBT people